USS William C. Lawe has been the name of more than one United States Navy ship, and may refer to:

 , a destroyer escort cancelled during construction in 1944
 , a destroyer escort cancelled prior to construction in 1944
 , a destroyer in commission from 1946 to 1983

United States Navy ship names